The 1976 Quebec general election was held on November 15, 1976 to elect members to National Assembly of the Province of Quebec, Canada.  It was one of the most significant elections in Quebec history, rivalled only by the 1960 general election, and caused major repercussions in the rest of Canada. The Parti Québécois, led by René Lévesque, defeated the incumbent Quebec Liberal Party, led by Premier Robert Bourassa.

The Parti Québécois's campaign focused on providing good government, in  contrast the many scandals that had plagued the Liberals since 1973, The PQ's stated goal of achieving independence for Quebec from Canada was portrayed as only secondary, but the election of a sovereigntist government in Quebec caused great upset in the rest of Canada and led to extensive discussions about reforming the Canadian Confederation and finding ways of accommodating Quebec.

The Parti Québécois used its term in office to introduce numerous bills to implement its agenda. The first bill introduced in the new session of the National Assembly was legislation to confirm French as the sole official language of Quebec, and to implement measures to make this a social reality. The legislative number of this bill, "Bill One," was intended to signify the importance of the bill for the new government.  The bill was withdrawn and significantly altered, however, and was eventually re-introduced as "Bill 101" (or la Loi 101 in French), also known as the Charter of the French Language. With some modifications, the Charter of the French Language remains in effect today and has shaped modern Quebec society in far-reaching ways.

The 1976 election also set the stage for the 1980 Quebec referendum on the PQ's proposal for political independence in an economic union with the rest of Canada called sovereignty-association. The proposal was soundly defeated in the referendum.

Bourassa had called the election after only three years, well before the maximum possible term of five years. It is possible that he may have counted on a boost from his successful rescue of the 1976 Summer Olympics in Montreal after cost overruns and construction delays by the Montreal municipal government of Mayor Jean Drapeau. If so, he badly miscalculated. He not only lost the election, but was resoundingly defeated in his own riding by a PQ challenger. Bourassa resigned as Liberal leader, and his political career appeared to be over. He left Quebec and took up teaching positions in the United States and Europe. However, he later made a remarkable comeback in the 1985 general election.

The once-powerful Union Nationale made a modest comeback after being evicted from the legislature three years earlier. It won 11 seats under Rodrigue Biron and, for the first time, won significant support from some anglophone voters. An anglophone UN member, William Shaw was elected to the National Assembly. However, this proved to be the party's last hurrah. Successive floor-crossings, retirements, and resignations reduced the UN to only five members during the term. The party lost all of those remaining seats five years later, never to return; it would continue to exist nominally until 1989.

Results
The overall results were:

Note:

* Party did not nominate candidates in the previous election.

Individual ridings 
The results in each riding (electoral division) were:

Gaspésie–Îles-de-la-Madeleine and Bas-Saint-Laurent

|-
| style="background:whitesmoke;"|Bonaventure
|
|Jean-Paul Audet  6,168  31%
||
|Gérard D. Levesque  9,771  49%
|
|Louis-Georges Roy  3,836  19%
|
|Mariette Fortin  318  2%
|
|
|
|
||
|Gérard D. Levesque 
|-
| style="background:whitesmoke;"|Gaspé
|
|Jules Bélanger  7,630  32%
|
|Guy Fortier  7,885  33%
||
|Michel Le Moignan  8,305  35%
|
|Mario Gagnon  233  1%
|
|
|
|
||
|Guy Fortier
|-
| style="background:whitesmoke;"|Îles-de-la-Madeleine
||
|Denise Leblanc
|
|Louis-Philippe Lacroix
|
|Paul-Henri Tremblay
|
|Jean Cotten
|
|
|
|
||
|Louis-Philippe Lacroix
|-
| style="background:whitesmoke;"|Kamouraska-Témiscouata
||
|Léonard Lévesque
|
|Jean-Marie Pelletier
|
|Raynald Pelletier
|
|Claude Dionne
|
|
|
|
||
|Jean-Marie Pelletier
|-
| style="background:whitesmoke;"|Matane
||
|Yves Bérubé
|
|Marc-Yvan Côté
|
|Joseph-Marie Lévesque
|
|Roger Simard
|
|Léonard Boulay
|
|
||
|Marc-Yvan Côté
|-
| style="background:whitesmoke;"|Matapédia
||
|Léopold Marquis
|
|Bona Arsenault
|
|Gérard Bélanger
|
|Gérard Gagnon
|
|
|
|
||
|Bona Arsenault
|-
| style="background:whitesmoke;"|Rimouski
||
|Alain Marcoux
|
|Claude St-Hilaire
|
|Raynald Voyer
|
|Alain Martel
|
|
|
|Yvar Tronstad (Ind)
||
|Claude St-Hilaire
|-
| style="background:whitesmoke;"|Rivière-du-Loup
||
|Jules Boucher
|
|Paul Lafrance
|
|Réal Grondin
|
|Gérard Roy
|
|
|
|
||
|Paul Lafrance
|}

Côte-Nord and Saguenay–Lac-Saint-Jean

|-
| style="background:whitesmoke;"|Chicoutimi
||
|Marc-André Bédard
|
|Roch Bergeron
|
|Léopold Decoste
|
|Richard Nareau
|
|
||
|Marc-André Bédard
|-
| style="background:whitesmoke;"|Dubuc
||
|Hubert Desbiens
|
|Ghislain Harvey
|
|Julien Gauvin
|
|Antonio Brisson
|
|
||
|Ghislain Harvey
|-
| style="background:whitesmoke;"|Duplessis
||
|Denis Perron
|
|Henri-Paul Boudreau
|
|Roland Gauthier
|
|Jacques-A. Quirion
|
|Zebedee Nungak (No designation)
||
|Donald Gallienne
|-
| style="background:whitesmoke;"|Jonquière
||
|Claude Vaillancourt
|
|Gérald Harvey
|
|Roselda Duguay Brassard
|
|Serge Racine
|
|
||
|Gérald Harvey
|-
| style="background:whitesmoke;"|Lac-Saint-Jean
||
|Jacques Brassard
|
|Roger Pilote
|
|Charles-Henri Larouche
|
|Maurice Brodeur
|
|
||
|Roger Pilote
|-
| style="background:whitesmoke;"|Roberval
|
|Paul Néron
||
|Robert Lamontagne
|
|Antonio Genest
|
|Émilien Fradet
|
|
||
|Robert Lamontagne
|-
| style="background:whitesmoke;"|Saguenay
||
|Lucien Lessard
|
|Jean-Guy Tremblay
|
|Réal St-Laurent
|
|Camille Hélie
|
|
||
|Lucien Lessard
|}

Capitale-Nationale

|-
| style="background:whitesmoke;"|Charlesbourg
||
|Denis de Belleval
|
|André Harvey
|
|Henriot Gingras
|
|Sandor Tarçali
|
|Carmen Payne Lafleur
|
|
||
|André Harvey
|-
| style="background:whitesmoke;"|Charlevoix
|
|Gérard Drouin
||
|Raymond Mailloux
|
|Gaston Dion
|
|Angelo Emond
|
|
|
|
||
|Raymond Mailloux
|-
| style="background:whitesmoke;"|Chauveau
||
|Louis O'Neill
|
|Bernard Lachapelle
|
|Madeleine Parent Barrette
|
|Mathieu Tremblay
|
|
|
|
||
|Bernard Lachapelle
|-
| style="background:whitesmoke;"|Jean-Talon
|
|Louise Beaudoin
||
|Raymond Garneau
|
|Charles Boucher
|
|Vilmont Rodrigue
|
|
|
|
||
|Raymond Garneau
|-
| style="background:whitesmoke;"|Limoilou
||
|Raymond Gravel
|
|Fernand Houde
|
|Maurice Trottier
|
|J.-Noël Gravel
|
|Louisette Ouzilleau Dulac
|
|Julien Bilodeau (PCQ)Manon Demers (No designation)
||
|Fernand Houde
|-
| style="background:whitesmoke;"|Louis-Hébert
||
|Claude Morin
|
|Jean Marchand
|
|Raymond Cantin
|
|Jean-Paul Rhéaume
|
|
|
|
||
|Gaston Desjardins
|-
| style="background:whitesmoke;"|Montmorency
||
|Clément Richard
|
|Marcel Bédard
|
|Denise Deslauriers
|
|L.-P.-Antoine Bélanger
|
|
|
|
||
|Marcel Bédard
|-
| style="background:whitesmoke;"|Portneuf
|
|Gilles Naud
||
|Michel Pagé
|
|Antoine-B. Dussault
|
|Roland Godin
|
|Pierre Castonguay
|
|
||
|Michel Pagé
|-
| style="background:whitesmoke;"|Taschereau
||
|Richard Guay
|
|Irénée Bonnier
|
|Marcel Drouin
|
|Simon Brouard
|
|Jean-Marc Lemoine
|
|Lorraine Morin (PTQ)
||
|Irénée Bonnier
|-
| style="background:whitesmoke;"|Vanier
||
|Jean-François Bertrand
|
|Fernand Dufour
|
|Jean-Yves Lachance
|
|Alexandre Bertrand
|
|
|
|
||
|Fernand Dufour
|}

Mauricie

|-
| style="background:whitesmoke;"|Champlain
||
|Marcel Gagnon
|
|Normand Toupin
|
|Gilles Gauthier
|
|Robert Fournier
|
|
|
|
||
|Normand Toupin
|-
| style="background:whitesmoke;"|Laviolette
||
|Jean-Pierre Jolivet
|
|Prudent Carpentier
|
|Gaston Fortin
|
|Michel Mignault
|
|Réjean Gélinas
|
|Robert Deschamps (NPD-RMS)
||
|Prudent Carpentier
|-
| style="background:whitesmoke;"|Maskinongé
|
|Jacques Charette
||
|Yvon Picotte
|
|Serge Gagnon
|
|J.-Rodolphe Lemieux
|
|
|
|
||
|Yvon Picotte
|-
| style="background:whitesmoke;"|Saint-Maurice
||
|Yves Duhaime
|
|Marcel Bérard
|
|Robert Leclerc
|
|Roger Bélisle
|
|Pierre-Paul Prud'homme
|
|
||
|Marcel Bérard
|-
| style="background:whitesmoke;"|Trois-Rivières
||
|Denis Vaugeois
|
|Guy Bacon
|
|Jacques Trahan
|
|Gaétan Laflèche
|
|
|
|
||
|Guy Bacon
|}

Chaudière-Appalaches and Centre-du-Québec

|-
| style="background:whitesmoke;"|Arthabaska
||
|Jacques Baril
|
|Denis St-Pierre
|
|Constant Roy
|
|Rosaire Rainville
|
|
|
|
|
|vacant
|-
| style="background:whitesmoke;"|Beauce-Nord
||
|Adrien Ouellette
|
|Denis Sylvain
|
|Gérard Gourde
|
|Magella Brouard
|
|Robert Trudel
|
|
||
|Denis Sylvain
|-
| style="background:whitesmoke;"|Beauce-Sud
|
|Pierre Pelletier
|
|Guy Lebel
|
|
|
|
||
|Fabien Roy
|
|
||
|Fabien Roy
|-
| style="background:whitesmoke;"|Bellechasse
|
|Jean-Roch Côté
|
|Pierre Mercier
||
|Bertrand Goulet
|
|Sauveur Fradette
|
|Pierre-E. Plante
|
|
||
|Pierre Mercier
|-
| style="background:whitesmoke;"|Drummond
||
|Michel Clair
|
|Paul Delisle
|
|Roger Blais
|
|André Bergeron
|
|Armand Joyal
|
|
||
|Robert Malouin
|-
| style="background:whitesmoke;"|Frontenac
||
|Gilles Grégoire
|
|Henri Lecours
|
|Marc Bergeron
|
|Fernand Godin
|
|
|
|
||
|Henri Lecours
|-
| style="background:whitesmoke;"|Johnson
|
|Robert Normand
|
|Marcel Noël
||
|Maurice Bellemare
|
|Jules Degready
|
|
|
|
||
|Maurice Bellemare
|-
| style="background:whitesmoke;"|Lévis
||
|Jean Garon
|
|Vincent-F. Chagnon
|
|Cyrille Dubé
|
|Gilles Campagna
|
|
|
|
||
|Vincent-F. Chagnon
|-
| style="background:whitesmoke;"|Lotbinière
|
|Ghyslain Théberge
|
|Georges Massicotte
||
|Rodrigue Biron
|
|Gaston Judd
|
|
|
|
||
|Georges Massicotte
|-
| style="background:whitesmoke;"|Montmagny-L'Islet
|
|Maurice Chouinard
||
|Julien Giasson
|
|André Rousseau
|
|Clermont Avoine
|
|
|
|
||
|Julien Giasson
|-
| style="background:whitesmoke;"|Nicolet-Yamaska
|
|Jean-Paul Touchette
|
|Benjamin Faucher
||
|Serge Fontaine
|
|Gilbert Boisvert
|
|
|
|
||
|Benjamin Faucher
|}

Estrie

|-
| style="background:whitesmoke;"|Mégantic-Compton
|
|Serge Poulin
|
|Omer Dionne
||
|Fernand Grenier
|
|Robert Leroux
|
|
|
|
||
|Omer Dionne
|-
| style="background:whitesmoke;"|Orford
|
|Laurent Bertrand
||
|Georges Vaillancourt
|
|Kevin J. Danaher
|
|Alexandre Basque
|
|René Lavallée
|
|
||
|Georges Vaillancourt
|-
| style="background:whitesmoke;"|Richmond
|
|Maurice Tremblay
|
|Yvon Vallières
||
|Yvon Brochu
|
|Serge Lepage
|
|
|
|
||
|Yvon Vallières
|-
| style="background:whitesmoke;"|Saint-François
||
|Réal Rancourt
|
|Gérard Déziel
|
|Michel Laflamme
|
|Adélard Larose
|
|
|
|
||
|Gérard Déziel
|-
| style="background:whitesmoke;"|Sherbrooke
||
|Gérard Gosselin
|
|Jean-Paul Pépin
|
|Guy Bureau
|
|Rosario Lehoux
|
|
|
|Jacques Boutin (Ind)Robert Tremblay (No designation)
||
|Jean-Paul Pépin
|}

Montérégie

|-
| style="background:whitesmoke;"|Beauharnois
||
|Laurent Lavigne  15,508  46%
|
|Jean-H. Besner  11,572  35%
|
|Jacques Cardinal  5,224  16%
|
|Monique Groulx Lalonde  1,195  4%
|
|
|
|
||
|Gérard Cadieux
|-
| style="background:whitesmoke;"|Brome-Missisquoi
|
|Gérard Comptois
|
|Glendon Brown
||
|Armand Russell
|
|Normand Chouinard
|
|Jean-Gilles Chagnon
|
|Foster Wightman (Ind)Maurice Juteau (Ind)
||
|Glendon Brown
|-
| style="background:whitesmoke;"|Chambly
||
|Denis Lazure
|
|Guy St-Pierre
|
|Camille Barré
|
|Jerry Béland
|
|
|
|
||
|Guy St-Pierre
|-
| style="background:whitesmoke;"|Châteauguay
||
|Roland Dussault
|
|George Kennedy
|
|Charles Ross Duggan
|
|René Paré
|
|
|
|Albert Benoît (Ind)Réjean Dumouchel (No designation)
||
|George Kennedy
|-
| style="background:whitesmoke;"|Huntingdon
|
|Gérald Pinsonneault
|
|Kenneth Fraser
||
|Claude Dubois
|
|Claude Grégoire
|
|
|
|
||
|Kenneth Fraser
|-
| style="background:whitesmoke;"|Iberville
||
|Jacques Beauséjour
|
|Jacques Tremblay
|
|Urbain Morin
|
|Clovis Ménard
|
|
|
|
||
|Jacques Tremblay
|-
| style="background:whitesmoke;"|Laporte
||
|Pierre Marois
|
|Jean-Jacques Lemieux
|
|Marcel L'Ecuyer
|
|Wilbrod Trépanier
|
|
|
|Richard Lépine (PTQ)
||
|André Déom
|-
| style="background:whitesmoke;"|Laprairie
||
|Gilles Michaud
|
|Paul Berthiaume
|
|Stephan Olynyk
|
|André Mignault
|
|
|
|
||
|Paul Berthiaume
|-
| style="background:whitesmoke;"|Richelieu
||
|Maurice Martel
|
|Jean Cournoyer
|
|Camille Vertefeuille
|
|Guy Guilbault
|
|
|
|
||
|Claude Simard
|-
| style="background:whitesmoke;"|Saint-Hyacinthe
|
|Charles Tremblay
|
|Fernand Cornellier
||
|Fabien Cordeau
|
|Laurier Grenon
|
|Claude Coupal
|
|
||
|Fernand Cornellier
|-
| style="background:whitesmoke;"|Saint-Jean
||
|Jérôme Proulx
|
|Jacques Veilleux
|
|Jean-Pierre Paquin
|
|Lucille-H. Pérusse
|
|
|
|
||
|Jacques Veilleux
|-
| style="background:whitesmoke;"|Shefford
|
|Jean-R. Petit
||
|Richard Verreault
|
|Gilles Cadorette
|
|Gabriel Lacasse
|
|Léonce Boulanger
|
|
||
|Richard Verreault
|-
| style="background:whitesmoke;"|Taillon
||
|René Lévesque
|
|Fernand Blanchard
|
|John E. de Souza
|
|Henri Bourassa
|
|
|
|Jacques Beaudoin (NPD-RMS)
||
|Guy Leduc
|-
| style="background:whitesmoke;"|Vaudreuil-Soulanges
||
|Louise Sauvé Cuerrier
|
|Paul Phaneuf
|
|David G. M. Cape
|
|Paul-Émile Trépanier
|
|
|
|Lawrence Arthur Brown (NPD-RMS)
||
|Paul Phaneuf
|-
| style="background:whitesmoke;"|Verchères
||
|Jean-Pierre Charbonneau
|
|Marcel Ostiguy
|
|Jean Costello
|
|Gilberte Desruisseaux Labbé
|
|
|
|
||
|Marcel Ostiguy
|}

Montreal East

|-
| style="background:whitesmoke;"|Anjou
||
|Pierre-Marc Johnson  19,440  56%
|
|Yves Tardif  11,116  32%
|
|Albert Rossi  2,938  9%
|
|Fernand Roy  744  2%
|
|Réjean Pelletier  233  1%
|
|John Penner (NPD-RMS)  151  0.4%
||
|Yves Tardif
|-
| style="background:whitesmoke;"|Bourassa
||
|Patrice Laplante
|
|Lise Bacon
|
|Robert Brisson
|
|Paulette Danis St-Onge
|
|Carmine Ciccarelli
|
|Vittorina Rizotto Bronzati (PCQ)
||
|Lise Bacon
|-
| style="background:whitesmoke;"|Bourget
||
|Camille Laurin
|
|Jean Boudreault
|
|Armand Lagacé
|
|Albertine Martel Bombardier
|
|
|
|Micheline Ruelland (NPD-RMS)Maurice Gohier (PTQ)
||
|Jean Boudreault
|-
| style="background:whitesmoke;"|Crémazie
||
|Guy Tardif
|
|Jean Bienvenue
|
|Maurice L'Écuyer
|
|Léopold Mercier
|
|Gilles Legault
|
|Claire Da Sylva Demers (PCQ)André Lavallée (NPD-RMS)
||
|Jean Bienvenue
|-
| style="background:whitesmoke;"|Dorion
||
|Lise Payette
|
|Alfred Bossé
|
|Luigi Grasso
|
|Guy Lévesque
|
|Raymond Beaudoin
|
|Lorraine de Repentigny Vaillancourt (NPD-RMS)
||
|Alfred Bossé
|-
| style="background:whitesmoke;"|Gouin
||
|Rodrigue Tremblay
|
|Jean-M. Beauregard
|
|Yves Roy
|
|Alfred Levesque
|
|
|
|Céline Lenoir Boulanger (PTQ)Wilbray Thiffault (NPD-RMS)
||
|Jean-M. Beauregard
|-
| style="background:whitesmoke;"|Jeanne-Mance
||
|Henri-E. Laberge
|
|Aimé Brisson
|
|Pierre Grégoire
|
|Nicolino Ciarla
|
|Raymond O'Connor
|
|Bernadette Desrosiers Le Brun (PCQ)Paul Kouri (No designation)
||
|Aimé Brisson
|-
| style="background:whitesmoke;"|Lafontaine
||
|Marcel Léger
|
|Bernard Benoît
|
|Lucien Grenier
|
|Brunel Dion
|
|Fernand Plourde
|
|Claude Leblanc (Ind)
||
|Marcel Léger
|-
| style="background:whitesmoke;"|Laurier
|
|John Kambites
||
|André Marchand
|
|Georges Savoidakis
|
|Denise Chartrand Marion
|
|
|
|Christos Syros (AD)Joseph Mallaroni (PCQ)Pierre Bastien (NPD-RMS)
||
|André Marchand
|-
| style="background:whitesmoke;"|Maisonneuve
||
|Robert Burns
|
|Gilles Houle
|
|Arthur Goyette
|
|Michel Parret
|
|Jean-Guy Forget
|
|Louis Cauchy (NPD-RMS)Samuel Walsh (PCQ)Jeannine Warren (PTQ)André Frappier (No designation)
||
|Robert Burns
|-
| style="background:whitesmoke;"|Mercier
||
|Gérald Godin
|
|Robert Bourassa
|
|Giuseppe Anzini
|
|Robert Roy
|
|
|
|Henri-François Gautrin (NPD-RMS)Guy Desautels (PCQ)Gaston Morin (PTQ)Louise Ouimet (No designation)
||
|Robert Bourassa
|-
| style="background:whitesmoke;"|Rosemont
||
|Gilbert Paquette
|
|Gilles Bellemare
|
|Suzanne Charbonneau Touchette
|
|Octave Grosariu
|
|Lorenzo Marullo
|
|Luc Bégin (NPD-RMS)René Boulanger (PTQ)
||
|Gilles Bellemare
|-
| style="background:whitesmoke;"|Saint-Jacques
||
|Claude Charron
|
|Micheline Lachapelle Brisebois
|
|Jacques Poirier
|
|Gaston Pleau
|
|
|
|Michel Bourdouxhe (NPD-RMS)Gérard Lachance (PTQ)Hervé Fuyet (PCQ)
||
|Claude Charron
|-
| style="background:whitesmoke;"|Sainte-Marie
||
|Guy Bisaillon
|
|Jean-Claude Malépart
|
|André Roy
|
|Roger Hébert
|
|
|
|André Rousseau (PTQ)René Denis (NPD-RMS)
||
|Jean-Claude Malépart
|-
| style="background:whitesmoke;"|Sauvé
||
|Jacques-Yvan Morin
|
|Jean-Claude Legault
|
|Marcel Hotte
|
|Gérard Ledoux
|
|
|
|Mario de Brentani (PCQ)Joseph-Léopold Gagner (Ind)
||
|Jacques-Yvan Morin
|-
| style="background:whitesmoke;"|Viau
||
|Charles-A. Lefebvre
|
|Fernand Sauvé
|
|Antonio Marciano
|
|Joseph Ouellet
|
|Luigino Mariano
|
|
||
|Fernard Picard
|}

Montreal West

|-
| style="background:whitesmoke;"|L'Acadie
|
|Hélène Savard Jacob
||
|Thérèse Lavoie-Roux
|
|Jean-Guy Leboeuf
|
|Madeleine Piquette Bédard
|
|
|
|Diane Poirier (AD)Pierre Lemaire (NPD-RMS)
|
|vacant
|-
| style="background:whitesmoke;"|D'Arcy-McGee
|
|Jacques Mackay
||
|Victor Charles Goldbloom
|
|Barry Fridhandler
|
|Gaëtan Gauthier
|
|
|
|Elie Chalouh (AD)Max Wollach (Ind)
||
|Victor Charles Golbloom
|-
| style="background:whitesmoke;"|Jacques-Cartier
|
|Paul Olsen
||
|Noël Saint-Germain
|
|Donavan James Carter
|
|Huguette Zakrzewski Bergeron
|
|
|
|Graham Weeks (AD)
||
|Noël Saint-Germain
|-
| style="background:whitesmoke;"|Marguerite-Bourgeoys
|
|Gérard Kentzinger
||
|Fernand Lalonde
|
|Domenico Izzi
|
|Raymond Jacques
|
|
|
|Thomas Rufh (NPD-RMS)
||
|Fernand Lalonde
|-
| style="background:whitesmoke;"|Mont-Royal
|
|André Normandeau
||
|John Ciaccia
|
|Victor Podd
|
|Étienne Lupien
|
|
|
|Sarazin Watts (AD)Monroe Dolman (NPD-RMS)Richard Ducharme (PCQ)
||
|John Ciaccia
|-
| style="background:whitesmoke;"|Notre-Dame-de-Grâce
|
|Pierre Mailloux
||
|Bryce Mackasey
|
|Francis Donaldson
|
|Auguste Gagné
|
|Carl O'Malley
|
|Robert Keaton (AD)John Raudsepp (Ind)Cyril Durocher (NPD-RMS)
||
|William Tetley
|-
| style="background:whitesmoke;"|Outremont
|
|Pierre Harvey
||
|André Raynauld
|
|
|
|Archélas Turgeon
|
|Jérôme Choquette
|
|Régis Parent (Ind)Denis Gervais (PCQ)
||
|Jérôme Choquette
|-
| style="background:whitesmoke;"|Pointe-Claire
|
|Paul-Émile Faucher
|
|Roy Amaron
||
|William Shaw
|
|Gérard-Philippe Allaire
|
|Renaud Binette
|
|Jeannette Tremblay Burley (Ind)Reginald Edwards (AD)
||
|Arthur-E. Séguin
|-
| style="background:whitesmoke;"|Robert-Baldwin
|
|Gilles Corbeil
||
|John O'Gallagher
|
|Thea Bryan Barker
|
|Louis Lefebvre
|
|
|
|Robert Beale (Ind)George Donald Boutilier (AD)Leo Rotgaus (Ind)
||
|Jean Cournoyer
|-
| style="background:whitesmoke;"|Sainte-Anne
||
|Jean-Marc Lacoste
|
|Bruno Fortin
|
|Fernand Brais
|
|Lucette Bourque Foster
|
|Noël Parenteau
|
|Colin Hanley (Ind)Paul Baatz (AD)David Johnston (PCQ)
||
|George Springate
|-
| style="background:whitesmoke;"|Saint-Henri
||
|Jacques Couture
|
|Donat Taddeo
|
|Roland Meloche
|
|René Raymond
|
|
|
|Denis Poulin (NPD-RMS)Angela Boulianne Gagnon (PTQ)
||
|Gérard Shanks
|-
| style="background:whitesmoke;"|Saint-Laurent
|
|Paul Unterberg
||
|Claude Forget
|
|Stanley Knox
|
|Normand Laroche
|
|Jean-Pierre Dorais
|
|Ghislain Cayouette (AD)
||
|Claude Forget
|-
| style="background:whitesmoke;"|Saint-Louis
|
|Line Lescarbeau Bourgeois
||
|Harry Blank
|
|Bernard Talisman
|
|Guy Taillon
|
|
|
|Mair Williams Verthuy (AD)Jean-Pierre Bourdouxhe (NPD-RMS)Jeannette Pratte Walsh (PCQ)
||
|Harry Blank
|-
| style="background:whitesmoke;"|Verdun
|
|Yvan Fortin
||
|Lucien Caron
|
|Mark A. Wainberg
|
|Joseph alias Rivard Delarosbil
|
|
|
|Seymour Small (AD)Robin Gagnon (PTQ)
||
|Lucien Caron
|-
| style="background:whitesmoke;"|Westmount
|
|Gaston Laurion
||
|George Springate
|
|Harold Fairhead
|
|Gaétan Pelletier
|
|Berthe Guertin Ouellet
|
|Nick Auf der Maur (AD)
||
|Kevin Drummond
|}

Laval

|-
| style="background:whitesmoke;"|Fabre
||
|Bernard Landry
|
|Gilles Houde
|
|Julien Laurier
|
|Conrad Gauthier
|
|Maurice Arbour
|
|
||
|Gilles Houde
|-
| style="background:whitesmoke;"|Laval
|
|Michel Leduc
||
|Jean-Noël Lavoie
|
|Charles Chaput
|
|Jean-Rock Gauthier
|
|Saad Marcos Bishara
|
|
||
|Jean-Noël Lavoie
|-
| style="background:whitesmoke;"|Mille-Îles
||
|Guy Joron
|
|Bernard Lachance
|
|Thérèse Bourque Clermont
|
|Émilien Martel
|
|Pierre Guillemette
|
|Claude Demers (PCQ)Ghislain Hallé (NPD-RMS)
||
|Bernard Lachance
|}

Laurentides

|-
| style="background:whitesmoke;"|Argenteuil
|
|Paul-André David
||
|Zoël Saindon
|
|Alphonse Bélec
|
|Claude Guay
|
|
||
|Zoël Saindon
|-
| style="background:whitesmoke;"|Deux-Montagnes
||
|Pierre de Bellefeuille
|
|Jean-Paul L'Allier
|
|Normand Robidoux
|
|Fernand Houle
|
|François-de-Salles Robert
||
|Jean-Paul L'Allier
|-
| style="background:whitesmoke;"|Laurentides-Labelle
||
|Jacques Léonard
|
|Roger Lapointe
|
|Laurent Jetté
|
|Antonio Lemire
|
|
||
|Roger Lapointe
|-
| style="background:whitesmoke;"|Prévost
||
|Jean-Guy Cardinal
|
|Bernard Parent
|
|Oscar Gonthier
|
|Albert Pouliot
|
|
||
|Bernard Parent
|}

Lanaudière

|-
| style="background:whitesmoke;"|Berthier
||
|Jean-Guy Mercier
|
|Michel Denis
|
|Joseph Ouimet
|
|Rosaire Trudel
|
|
|
|
||
|Michel Denis
|-
| style="background:whitesmoke;"|Joliette-Montcalm
||
|Guy Chevrette
|
|Robert Quenneville
|
|André Asselin
|
|Jean-Pierre Gagné
|
|
|
|Jacques Trudeau (PTQ)Isabelle Geoffroy (No designation)
||
|Robert Quenneville
|-
| style="background:whitesmoke;"|L'Assomption
||
|Jacques Parizeau
|
|Roland Comtois
|
|Michel Duval
|
|Louis Comtois
|
|Henri Kélada
|
|
||
|Jean Perreault
|-
| style="background:whitesmoke;"|Terrebonne
||
|Élie Fallu
|
|Denis Hardy
|
|Marcel Ayotte
|
|Guy Meunier
|
|
|
|
||
|Denis Hardy
|}

Outaouais

|-
| style="background:whitesmoke;"|Gatineau
|
|Marc-André Tardif
||
|Michel Gratton
|
|Jacques-H. Crépeau
|
|Gérard Ouellet
|
|
|
|
||
|Michel Gratton
|-
| style="background:whitesmoke;"|Hull
||
|Jocelyne Ouellette
|
|Oswald Parent
|
|Dan Brunet
|
|Yvon Larocque
|
|
|
|
||
|Oswald Parent
|-
| style="background:whitesmoke;"|Papineau
||
|Jean Alfred
|
|Normand Racicot
|
|Sylvio Huneault
|
|Herbert Carriere
|
|Gilbert Dupuis
|
|
||
|Mark Assad
|-
| style="background:whitesmoke;"|Pontiac-Témiscamingue
|
|Jean-Robert Seguier
||
|Jean-Guy Larivière
|
|Jean-Rock Bernard
|
|Emmanuel Pétrin
|
|
|
|Richard Bowie (Ind)
||
|Jean-Guy Larivière
|}

Abitibi-Témiscamingue and Nord-du-Québec

|-
| style="background:whitesmoke;"|Abitibi-Est
||
|Jean-Paul Bordeleau
|
|Paul-Étienne Violette
|
|Médéric Barrette
|
|Pierre Dallaire
||
|Roger Houde
|-
| style="background:whitesmoke;"|Abitibi-Ouest
||
|François Gendron
|
|Jean-Hugues Boutin
|
|Kenneth Kenny
|
|Roger Bureau
||
|Jean-Hugues Boutin
|-
| style="background:whitesmoke;"|Rouyn-Noranda
|
|Réal Roy
|
|Henri Miljours
|
|Jean-Claude Chevalier
||
|Camil Samson
||
|Camil Samson
|}

See also
 List of Quebec premiers
 Politics of Quebec
 Timeline of Quebec history
 List of Quebec political parties
 31st National Assembly of Quebec

External links
 CBC TV video clip
 Results by party (total votes and seats won)
 Results for all ridings

References

Quebec general election
Elections in Quebec
General election
Quebec general election